Baltasar Sánchez Martín (born 9 May 1962), commonly known as Balta, is a Spanish former footballer who played as a central defender, and a current manager.

Playing career
Born in Santander, Cantabria, Balta was a UD Salamanca youth graduate. After being promoted to the first team in 1984, he represented them in both Segunda División and Segunda División B over 11 seasons, playing 274 league matches and scoring 22 goals.

Balta was part of the squad that competed in La Liga in 1983–84, but failed to appear in any games. He retired in 1995 at the age of 33, after helping to promotion to the top flight.

Coaching career
Shortly after his retirement, Balta started working as an assistant manager at his only club, acting as an occasional interim coach. In March 2001 he was appointed at the main squad, but was dismissed in October of the following year.

In November 2003, Balta was named Zamora CF manager, and led the side to the play-offs final in 2004, losing to CD Castellón. He was relieved of his duties in November 2005, and was appointed at the helm of Logroñés CF in the summer of 2006.

Balta was fired on 19 November 2007, after failing to win a single match in the campaign. In August 2009 he returned to Salamanca, now as a director of football.

On 12 April 2011, Balta was appointed manager of the Charros after replacing José Murcia. He eventually suffered relegation from the second level and left his post on 14 November, returning to his previous staff role.

Balta returned to Zamora on 30 April 2015, tasked with saving the team from relegation in the last three games of the third-tier campaign. They descended to Tercera División, and won their group the next season, but he was sacked on 5 June 2016 after a 3–1 loss to UD Mutilvera in the first leg of the second round of the play-offs.

See also
List of one-club men

References

External links

1962 births
Living people
Spanish footballers
Footballers from Santander, Spain
Association football defenders
Segunda División players
Segunda División B players
Tercera División players
UD Salamanca players
Spanish football managers
La Liga managers
Segunda División managers
Segunda División B managers
UD Salamanca managers
Zamora CF managers